Pioneertown, California, is an unincorporated community of the Morongo Basin region of San Bernardino's High Desert. The historical town was originally incorporated in 1946 and fell into the hands of San Bernardino County in the late 1960s. The winding,  drive northwest to Pioneertown from Yucca Valley has been designated a California Scenic Drive and the area is now surrounded by privately and federally protected lands.

History
Actor Dick Curtis started up the town in 1946 as an 1880s themed live-in Old West living, breathing motion-picture set. The town was designed to provide a place for production companies to enjoy while also using their businesses and homes in movies. Hundreds of Westerns and early television shows were filmed in Pioneertown, including The Cisco Kid and Edgar Buchanan's Judge Roy Bean.

Dick Curtis, Roy Rogers and Russell Hayden were some of the original developers and investors.  Gene Autry filmed his weekly show in town for 5 years, using the buildings and businesses as part of the film set.
The first episode accidentally features the Pioneer Bowl sign, which was usually covered for filming, and Pioneer Bowl is still an operating bowling alley. The third building to be built in Pioneertown, Pioneer Bowl was used for recreation for the residents, actors and crew after filming.  Roy Rogers made the front page of the local newspaper when he opened the bowl with a strike on Lane one.  He bowled a 211 game in his cowboy boots with Dale Evans and 200 town folk watching.   Bowling leagues were an active part of American culture, and dozens of businesses had leagues at Pioneer Bowl, especially after western films were no longer being made in town.  Many locals remember being pin boys for the bowl until some of the first automatic pinsetters made by Brunswick were installed.  The Thompson and White family partnership built the bowl in 1946.  Mrs. White volunteered to be the first postmistress of Pioneertown, and the first post office was located inside the bowling alley.

The werewolf movie Howling 7 was filmed in Pioneertown and used many of its locals as cast members.

In 2020, Pioneertown's Mane Street area was recognized as a historic district by the National Register of Historic Places.

21st century
, Pioneertown had a population of 420.

In July 2006, parts of Pioneertown were burned in the Sawtooth Complex fire, which also burned into Yucca Valley and Morongo Valley. Firefighters managed to save the historic movie-set buildings, but much of the surrounding desert habitat was damaged. 
Among the buildings saved was Pappy & Harriet's Pioneertown Palace, a longtime local club and landmark built within the town's original and only gas station, which counts among its regular patrons notable musicians, including Eric Burdon and Robert Plant of Led Zeppelin fame.

Mane Street in downtown Pioneertown is open to the public.

As Pioneertown is a working movie set, commercial production & photography is allowed by permit only.

On January 18, 2019, the Kidz Bop Kids used Pioneertown as the set for their music video for the cover of Lil Nas X's song, Old Town Road.

As a tourist town, Pioneertown offers reenacted western style gun shows, live music, a film museum, pottery classes, and horse camping.

Notable people
Nancy Wilson (1937–2018), jazz singer and actress
Thomas Alban, sculptor, pottery artist and owner at MazAmar Art Pottery

Gallery

References

Further reading
 Rafton, Louise.  “Pioneertown”, Westways Magazine, March/April 2005
 Stringfellow, Kim. mojaveproject.org: "That High Desert Sound" 
 Gentry, Kenneth. "Pioneertown USA"

External links

"Pioneertown, USA: The Definitive History of Pioneertown, CA. Where the Old West Lives Again!" 2018, 308 pages  via Amazon.com
 Pioneertown Sun – Pioneertown historical research, photo and video archive website
 List of productions shot in Pioneertown from IMDb

Backlot sets
Yucca Valley, California
Unincorporated communities in San Bernardino County, California
Unincorporated communities in California